Paul Remy Castanet (16 March 1880 in Clamart – 8 December 1967 in Malakoff) was an early twentieth century French middle-distance runner. He participated in Athletics at the 1900 Summer Olympics in Paris and won the silver medal in the 5000 metres team race for the French team with Jacques Chastanie, Henri Deloge and Gaston Ragueneau.

References

External links
 

French male middle-distance runners
Olympic silver medalists for France
Olympic athletes of France
Athletes (track and field) at the 1900 Summer Olympics
1880 births
1967 deaths
People from Clamart
Olympic silver medalists in athletics (track and field)
Medalists at the 1900 Summer Olympics
19th-century French people
20th-century French people
Sportspeople from Hauts-de-Seine